Saint-André-de-Vézines is a commune in the Aveyron department in southern France.

Population

In the past, there were about 45 families in the village. Today, there are only 20, among whom many are retired.

See also
Communes of the Aveyron department

References

Communes of Aveyron
Aveyron communes articles needing translation from French Wikipedia